Wheaties is an American brand of breakfast cereal that is made by General Mills. It is well known for featuring prominent athletes on its packages and has become a cultural icon in the United States. Originally introduced as Washburn's Gold Medal Whole Wheat Flakes in 1924, it is primarily a wheat and bran mixture baked into flakes.

History

Creation 

Wheaties was created in 1921, as a result of an accidental spill of a wheat bran mixture onto a hot stove by a Minnesota clinician working for the Washburn Crosby Company (later General Mills). By November 1924, after more than 36 attempts to strengthen the flakes to withstand packaging, the process for creating the flakes had been perfected by the Washburn head miller, George Cormack, and the cereal was named Washburn's Gold Medal Whole Wheat Flakes. Soon after, the name was changed to Wheaties as a result of an employee contest won by Jane Bausman, the wife of a company export manager. Other names passed over included "Nutties" and "Gold Medal Wheat Flakes."

Wheaties began to be advertised on Minneapolis's WCCO radio station (owned by Washburn Crosby) on December 24, 1926, with the first-ever pre-recorded commercial jingle.  Its lyrics were sung to the tune of the then-popular "She's a Jazz Baby" by Bill Holcombe and David Miller or possibly to the tune of "Jazz Baby":

Early sports association 

Wheaties began its association with sports in 1927, through advertising on the southern wall of minor league baseball's Nicollet Park in Minneapolis, Minnesota. In the contract, Wheaties sponsored the radio broadcasts of the minor league baseball team, Minneapolis Millers, on radio station WCCO and Wheaties was provided with a large billboard in the park to use to introduce new slogans. The first such slogan on the new signboard was penned by Knox Reeves, of a Minneapolis advertising agency. When asked what should be placed on the sign for Wheaties, Reeves sketched a Wheaties box on a pad of paper, thought for a moment, and wrote "Wheaties—The Breakfast of Champions".

Throughout the 1930s, Wheaties increased in popularity with its sponsorship of baseball broadcasting, and by the end of the decade, nearly a hundred radio stations carried Wheaties sponsored events. During these events, athlete testimonials about Wheaties were used to demonstrate that Wheaties was indeed the breakfast of champions.  In 1934, athletes began to be depicted on the Wheaties boxes, starting with baseball star Lou Gehrig, and the tradition continues today.

The heyday of Wheaties came in the 1930s and early 1940s, as testimonials peaked from nearly every sport imaginable. Among the many testimonials included were: baseball stars, managers, and trainers; broadcasters; football stars and coaches; circus stars and rodeo; livestock breeders; a railroad engineer; horsemen and jockeys; a big-game hunter; automobile racers; an aviator; a speedboat driver; an explorer; and parachutists.

Wheaties maintained brand recognition through its definitive association with sports, and its distinctive orange boxes. It became so popular that in the 1939 All-star game, 46 of the 51 players endorsed the cereal. In the months following, Wheaties became one of the sponsors of the very first televised sports broadcast to allow commercials.  On August 29, 1939, NBC television presented the first major league baseball game ever televised between the Cincinnati Reds and the Brooklyn Dodgers to approximately 500 television set owners in New York City over experimental station W2XBS (now WNBC). Red Barber was the play-by-play broadcaster.  Although full commercial television would not be authorized until July 1, 1941, the FCC allowed commercials to be inserted in this particular, special event broadcast as a test.  Barber had to ad-lib three live commercials, one for each Dodger sponsor.  For Procter & Gamble, he held up a bar of Ivory Soap.  For Socony, Barber put on a Mobil gas station cap and raised a can of oil.  For General Mills, he poured Wheaties into a bowl, added milk and sugar on top (some reports say he also sliced a banana), then proclaimed "Now that's the breakfast of champions."  "There was not a cue card in sight", Barber said.

A measure of the product's familiarity is the reference in the 1941 baseball song Joltin' Joe DiMaggio, performed by Les Brown and his orchestra during DiMaggio's record hitting streak. In the song, DiMaggio gets a clutch base hit, and the band awards him "a case of Wheaties".

Tagline 
 Eaties For Wheaties
 The Breakfast of Champions
 You Better Eat Your Wheaties

Ties with Ronald Reagan 

Wheaties radio broadcasting in the 1930s touched the early career of Ronald Reagan, who was at the time a sports broadcast announcer in Des Moines, Iowa. He was asked to create play-by-play recreations of Chicago Cubs baseball games using transcribed telegraph reports; his job performance in this role led to his selection in 1937 as the most popular Wheaties announcer in the nation. He was awarded an all-expenses-paid trip to the Cubs' spring training camp in California, and while there he took a Warner Bros. screen test. This led to his eventual film career; thus the Wheaties claim of perhaps leading Reagan into show business, and later politics as governor of California and 40th President of the United States.

Changes and children's promotions 

Due to increasing costs in the 1940s of sponsorship of broadcasting, Wheaties began simple commercial sports testimonials on television or radio. These were less effective than the overall sponsorship (especially in the case of television), yet also greatly reduced costs for advertising of the product.

In the early 1950s, General Mills redirected its promotional strategy for Wheaties to focus on children, following its great success in this market with its Cheerios brand.  The strategy included sponsorship of The Lone Ranger and The Mickey Mouse Club, as well as the development of a mascot, a puppet character called Champy the Lion, produced by Bil Baird and voiced by Thurl Ravenscroft.  Despite these efforts, sales of Wheaties declined dramatically, mainly due to adult consumers' dislike of so-called children's cereals.  Children's consumption of Wheaties did in fact increase, but not enough to offset the decline in adult consumption.

Return of sports-related promotions 

In 1958, General Mills decided to combat the decline in sales by returning Wheaties to its sporting roots. A three-pronged marketing strategy was devised. The first element was the selection of the brand's first spokesman, Bob Richards, two-time Olympic pole vault champion.  The second was the reentry of Wheaties into the sports television sponsorship arena, pioneering the concepts of the pre-game and post-game show. The third was the creation of the Wheaties Sports Federation. The Wheaties Sports Federation promoted physical fitness, training, and participation in athletic events, through direct financial support of Olympic educational programs and the Jaycee Junior Champ track and field competition, and also through educational and instructional athletic films.

From the 1960s through the 1990s, Wheaties provided in-box promotions but maintained a focus on athletic fitness and on-the-box sports figure promotions. Since the debut of the front cover depiction of Bob Richards, hundreds of athletes have been shown and promoted, including entire baseball, basketball, and football teams, while also highlighting Olympic successes (including regional Special Olympics editions). Wheaties also does not limit itself to current athletic stars, as special edition boxes have depicted baseball players from the early 20th century, and many athletes who were too early for Wheaties to cover (see Jim Thorpe).

Decline in sales 
Recently, sales of Wheaties in the US has declined significantly. From 2005 to 2014 sales of Wheaties declined 78%.

Wheaties firsts and records 

 1926 – First ever singing radio commercial, using the jingle "Have you tried Wheaties?" (to the tune of Jazz Baby)
 1934 – First athlete depicted on a Wheaties box – Baseball player Lou Gehrig
 1934 – First woman depicted on a Wheaties box – Aviator Elinor Smith
 1935 – First woman athlete depicted on a Wheaties box – Golfer and athlete Babe Didrikson Zaharias
 1936 – First African American athlete on a Wheaties box – Jesse Owens
 1939 – First televised commercial sports broadcast sponsorship, of the 1939 Major League Baseball All-Star Game
 1958 – First athlete depicted on the front of a Wheaties box – Pole vaulter Bob Richards
 1969 – First male golfer depicted on the front of a Wheaties box – Lee Trevino
 1984 – First woman athlete depicted on the front of a Wheaties box – Gymnast Mary Lou Retton
 1984 – First high school athlete depicted on the front of a Wheaties box – Chris Spielman
 1986 – First NFL player depicted on the front of a Wheaties box – Walter Payton
 1988 – First cyclist depicted on the front of a Wheaties box – Doug Smith
 1987 – First team depicted on a Wheaties box – 1987 World Series Champion Minnesota Twins
 1991 – First ice hockey team depicted on a Wheaties box – 1991 Stanley Cup Champion Pittsburgh Penguins
 1992 – First non-orange Wheaties box, colored red and black in honor of the Chicago Bulls
 1997 – First automobile race driver depicted on the front of a Wheaties box – Dale Earnhardt
 1999 – First professional wrestler depicted on the front of a Wheaties box – Stone Cold Steve Austin
 2001 – First sambo wrestler featured on Wheaties boxes (Wheaties Energy Crunch) – James Chico Hernandez
 2002 – First university wrestler featured on Wheaties boxes – Cael Sanderson
 2005 – First women professional sports team to appear on Wheaties box – Sacramento Monarchs
 2006 – First college football rivalry to appear on Wheaties box – State Farm Lone Star Showdown, the rivalry between the Texas A&M Aggies and the Texas Longhorns
 2012 – 9-year-old Samantha Gordon is the first female football player to be featured on a Wheaties box.
 2014 – First Mixed Martial Arts fighter depicted on the front of the Wheaties box – Anthony Pettis
 2016 – First motocross racer to appear on Wheaties box – Ryan Dungey
 Michael Jordan holds the record for most depictions on a Wheaties box, a total of 18 times, followed by Tiger Woods at 14 times.

Spokespersons 

There have been a total of seven spokespersons for the Wheaties brand since 1958, listed here with their date of selection:

 Bob Richards – 1958
 Bruce Jenner – 1977
 Mary Lou Retton – 1984
 Walter Payton – 1986
 Chris Evert – 1987
 Michael Jordan – 1988
 Tiger Woods – 1998

Related cereals 

Like many popular cereal brands from the early 20th century, Wheaties has had its share of spin-off brands. Also, several athletes featured on the cereal boxes of regular Wheaties are featured on these brands. These are the four brands which have been created in response to the popularity of Wheaties, along with their introduction date:

 Honey Frosted Wheaties (Commonly abbreviated HFW) – 1996
 Crispy Wheaties 'n' Raisins (Commonly abbreviated CWR) – 1996
 Wheaties Energy Crunch (Commonly abbreviated WEC) – 2002
 Wheaties Fuel – 2009

Australia and New Zealand

In Australia and New Zealand, the spelling is 'Weeties'. Variants are made by Sanitarium and the General Mills/Nestlé subsidiary Uncle Tobys.

See also 

 List of athletes on Wheaties boxes
 List of breakfast cereals

References

External links 

 
 Early Wheaties History 

Products introduced in 1924
General Mills cereals
Flaked breakfast cereals